The third season of Criminal Minds premiered on CBS on September 26, 2007 and ended May 21, 2008. The third season was originally to have featured 25 episodes; however, only 13 were completed before the Writers Guild of America strike (2007–08). Seven more episodes were produced after the strike, bringing the total number of episodes to 20 for the third season. Mandy Patinkin wanted to leave the series, since he loathed the violent nature of it. He was replaced by Joe Mantegna several episodes later.

Cast

Main 
 Mandy Patinkin as Supervisory Special Agent Jason Gideon (BAU Senior Agent) Ep. 1-2
 Joe Mantegna as Supervisory Special Agent David Rossi (BAU Senior Agent) Ep. 6-20
 Paget Brewster as Supervisory Special Agent Emily Prentiss (BAU Agent)
 Shemar Moore as Supervisory Special Agent Derek Morgan (BAU Agent)
 Matthew Gray Gubler as Supervisory Special Agent Dr. Spencer Reid (BAU Agent)
 A. J. Cook as Supervisory Special Agent Jennifer "JJ" Jareau (BAU Communications Liaison)
 Kirsten Vangsness as Special Agent Penelope Garcia (BAU Technical Analyst)
 Thomas Gibson as Supervisory Special Agent Aaron "Hotch" Hotchner (BAU Unit Chief)

Special guest stars 
 Frankie Muniz as Jonny McHale
 Fredric Lehne as Jack Vaughan

Recurring 
 Jayne Atkinson as Supervisory Special Agent Erin Strauss (BAU Section Chief)
 Nicholas Brendon as Kevin Lynch
 Meredith Monroe as Haley Hotchner
 Cade Owens as Jack Hotchner
 Josh Stewart as William "Will" LaMontagne Jr.

Guest stars 

In the season premiere "Doubt", Shelly Cole guest-starred as Anna Begley, a suicidal college student who copied the crimes of Nathan Tubbs, aka "The Campus Killer". Alexa Alemanni guest-starred as Amy Deckerman, Anna Begley's first murder victim. In the episode "In Name and Blood", Eddie Cibrian guest-starred as Joe Smith, a serial killer who uses his son to lure women and murder them. Gordon Clapp guest-starred as Detective Victor Wolynski, who leads the investigation of the murders. In the episode "Scared to Death", Michael O'Keefe guest-starred as Dr. Stanley Howard, a psychiatrist who uses his patients' worst fears to murder them. 

 

In the episode "Children of the Dark", Francis Capra guest-starred as Ervin Robles, a serial killer who was abused by a strict foster family. William Lee Scott guest-starred as Robles' foster brother and accomplice Gary, and Christine Healy guest-starred as Mrs. Manwaring, an abusive foster mother. In the episode "Seven Seconds", Ariel Winter guest-starred as Katie Jacobs, a young girl who is kidnapped at a shopping mall. Suzanne Cryer guest-starred as Susan Jacobs, Katie Jacobs' aunt who might be involved in her disappearance. Paula Malcomson guest-starred as Katie's mother, Beth, and Alexander Gould guest-starred as Susan's son, Jeremy. 

In the episode "About Face", Andrew Kavovit guest-starred as Max Poole, aka "The Have You Seen Me Murderer". Michael O'Neill guest-starred as Detective Frank Yarborough, who investigates the murder of his wife's friend. In the episode "Identity", Kaj-Erik Eriksen guest-starred as Henry Frost, a serial killer who assumed the identity of his partner in crime and idol, Francis Goehring, who committed suicide. Pat Skipper guest-starred as Harris Townsend, a retired U.S. Special Forces sniper who reluctantly assists the BAU during a standoff. In the episode "Lucky", Michael Beach guest-starred as Father Marks, and Nick Searcy guest-starred as Detective Jordan. In the episode "True Night", Frankie Muniz guest-starred as Johnny McHale, a famous comic book artist whose recent works have striking resemblances to murders he might have committed. 

In the episode "3rd Life", Riley Smith guest-starred as Ryan Phillips, a thrill killer who leads a trio of abductors. Gia Mantegna (daughter of series star Joe Mantegna) guest-starred as Lindsey Vaughan, a teenage girl who is kidnapped by Ryan's gang, Hayley McFarland guest-starred as Katie Owens, the first victim raped and murdered by Ryan's Gang, Fredric Lehne guest-starred as Jack Vaughan, a former hitman and Lindsey's father, and Michael Harney guest-starred as U.S. Marshal Pat Mannan. 

In the episode "Limelight", Andrea Roth guest-starred as Jill Morris, an FBI Agent whose lust for fame and less concern for eventual collateral damage becomes more apparent to the BAU. In the episode "Damaged", Dennis Christopher guest-starred as Abner Merriman, a prison warden who allows Hotch and Reid to interview Chester Hardwick, an inmate on death row. 

In the episode "A Higher Power", Jennifer Aspen guest-starred as Laurie Ann Morris, a depressed woman who was convinced by Peter Redding to kill herself. Renee O'Connor guest-starred as Pam Baleman, the wife of Paul Baleman, one of the apparent suicides, and sister-in-law of Detective Ronnie Baleman, who is investigating. In the episode "Elephant's Memory", Cody Kasch guest-starred as Owen Savage, a spree killer who is going after those who have wronged him during his childhood. Lindsey Haun guest-starred as Jordan Norris, Owen's girlfriend, and Alexandra Krosney guest-starred as Eileen Bechtold, Jordan's friend. In the episode "In Heat", Michael Graziadei guest-starred as Steven Fitzgerald, a serial killer confused about his sexual orientation. Tia Texada guest-starred as Detective Tina Lopez, who leads the investigation of the murders. 

  

In the episode "The Crossing", Scott Lowell guest-starred as Michael Hicks, a delusional stalker who obsesses over a woman named Keri Derzmond, played by Bonnie Root. Mary-Margaret Humes guest-starred as Audrey Sawyer-Henson, a battered housewife and mother who murdered her husband. In the episode "Tabula Rasa", Eric Lange guest-starred as Brian Matloff, aka "The Blue Ridge Strangler", a serial killer who suffers from amnesia after he attempted to evade the BAU by jumping off a building. In the season finale "Lo-Fi", Sienna Guillory guest-starred as Supervisory Special Agent Kate Joyner, an FBI Agent who aids the BAU in arresting members of the New York Terrorist Cell. Erik Palladino guest-starred as Detective Cooper, an NYPD officer who is shot in the line of duty by a member of the NYC terrorist cell.

Episodes

Home media

References

External links

Criminal Minds
2007 American television seasons
2008 American television seasons